Miss Earth is an annual international major beauty pageant based in the Philippines that advocates for environmental awareness, conservation and social responsibility. Along with Miss World, Miss Universe, and Miss International, it is one of the Big Four international beauty pageants.

Since 2002, the pageant has been mostly held in the Philippines with live international telecasts in more than 80 countries via The Filipino Channel.

Reigning titleholders dedicate their year to promoting specific projects, often addressing issues concerning the environment and other global challenges through school tours, tree planting activities, street campaigns, cleanups, speaking engagements, shopping mall tours, media guesting, environmental fairs, storytelling programs to children, eco-fashion shows, and other environmentally oriented activities.

The Miss Earth Foundation works with the environmental departments and ministries of participating countries, various private sectors and corporations, as well as the World Wildlife Foundation (WWF).

The current Miss Earth is Mina Sue Choi of South Korea who was crowned on November 29, 2022.

The current Elemental Queens are:
 Sheridan Mortlock: Miss Earth Air from Australia
 Nadeen Ayoub: Miss Earth Water from Palestine
 Andrea Aguilera: Miss Earth Fire from Colombia

Inception and early history

Carousel Productions launched the first edition of Miss Earth in 2001 as an international environmental event with the mission of using the beauty pageant entertainment industry as a tool to promote environmental preservation. The pageant was first formally introduced in a press conference on April 3, 2001.

In October 2001, Miss Earth adopted the slogan "Beauties For a Cause", but it wasn't until 2003 that the first "Beauty for a Cause" prize was awarded.

With more countries participating each year and more national Miss Earth pageants on every continent, in 2003 Miss Earth surpassed Miss International to become the third largest international beauty pageant by number of participating countries.

Programs and advocacy
The pageant has tie-ins with Philippine government agencies, such as the Philippine Department of Tourism (DoT), the Department of Environment and Natural Resources (DENR), and the Metropolitan Manila Development Authority (MMDA), as well as international environmental groups such as the United Nations Environment Programme (UNEP) and Greenpeace, to further its environmental advocacy. The pageant winner and her elemental court travel to various countries and involved in projects with the environmental departments and ministries of participating countries. The delegates also take part in tree planting ceremonies, environmental and cultural immersion programs, sponsor visits and tours.

In 2004, the Miss Earth Foundation was created to further the pageant's causes and to work with local and international groups and non-governmental organizations that are actively involved in conservation and improvement of the environment. The Miss Earth Foundation campaign focuses on educating young people in environmental awareness. Its major project, "I Love Planet Earth School Tour", teaches and distributes educational aids for school children. Miss Earth also partnered with the Philippine Daily Inquirer's "Read-Along Storytelling Program" to educate children on taking care of the environment, awareness on renewable energy, and biodiversity. The Miss Earth Foundation also educates people to act against environmental degradation and environmental protection by following the "5Rs": rethink, reduce, reuse, recycle, and respect.

In 2006, the Miss Earth pageant started to co-host the United Nations Environment Programme's Champions of the Earth, annual international environment awards established in 2005 by the United Nations to recognize outstanding environmental achievers and leaders at a policy level. Miss Earth also joined with Greenpeace to call for a ban on genetically-engineered food crops, promotion of organic farming and advancement of sustainable agriculture.

The Miss Earth Foundation teamed up with The Climate Reality Project in 2016 for the "Climate Reality Leadership Corps Training" conducted by its founder and chairman, former US Vice President, Al Gore to create an effective platform awareness on climate change.

Eco-fashion design competition
On November 4, 2008, the first Miss Earth Eco-Fashion Design Competition was launched by the Miss Earth Foundation as an annual event for professional and non-professional fashion designers to come up with designs that are eco-friendly. The outfit designs are made from recyclable, natural materials, organic materials, and eco-chic designs or patterns that can be worn in everyday life or are runway worthy.

Participating countries

The pageant has attracted delegates from countries and territories that typically frown upon beauty pageants.

In 2003, Vida Samadzai, an Afghan woman, now residing in the United States, received press attention after she competed in a red bikini. Samadzai was the first Afghan woman to compete in an international beauty pageant in almost three decades, but the fact that she wore a bikini caused an uproar in her native country. Her involvement in the pageant was condemned by the Afghan Supreme Court, saying such a display of the female body goes against Islamic law and Afghan culture.

In 2005, a Pakistani beauty queen, Naomi Zaman, was the first Miss Pakistan World winner to participate in Miss Earth, and is the first delegate from Pakistan to compete in any major international pageant; beauty pageants are frowned upon in Pakistan.

Miss Tibet Earth 2006, Tsering Chungtak, the first Tibetan to represent Tibet in any major international beauty pageant, made headlines when she drew international attention towards the Tibetan struggle for freedom. She also advocated for the boundaries of acceptable social etiquette towards the 21st century, in a traditionally conservative Tibetan culture, where most grown women wear ankle-length dresses. Nevertheless, her participation in the pageant received approval from the Dalai Lama.

Carousel Productions licensed the Miss Cuba organization in 2007 to select the first Cuban representative at Miss Earth. Ariana Barouk won; she became the first Miss Cuba in several decades, and competed at the Miss Earth pageant. Also in 2007 pageant, Miss Earth made history when delegates from China, Hong Kong, Macau, Taiwan, and Tibet all competed together for the first time in an international pageant in spite of political sensitivities.

In 2008, the Buddhist Kingdom of Bhutan, one of the world's most isolated nations, sent its first Miss Bhutan, Tsokye Tsomo Karchun. Rwanda also sent its first ever Miss Rwanda national winner, Cynthia Akazuba; both of them competed at the Miss Earth 2008 pageant.

In 2009, Beauties of Africa, Inc., the franchise holder of Miss Earth South Sudan sent Aheu Kidum Deng, Miss South Sudan 2009, who stands 196 cm (6 feet and 5 inches), and is the tallest documented beauty queen ever to take part in any international beauty pageants.

Palestine debuted in one of the Big Four pageants in 2016 via Miss Earth when Natali Rantissi represented Palestine with the approval of Mahmoud Abbas, the President of the State of Palestine and Palestinian National Authority, where she made a courtesy call at the Moukata Palace prior to her departure to participate in the pageant. Miss Palestine refused to wear a bikini but was allowed to partake in the events including in the Miss Earth 2016 finale.

Also in the 2016 edition of the pageant, Miss Iraq Organization sent Susan Amer Sulaimani as Iraq's first representative since 1972 in Big Four pageants to participate in Miss Earth 2016. She was the only one who wore a dress instead of a bikini during the pageant's press-conference.

In the 2017 pageant, Miss Rwanda Honorine Hirwa Uwase appeared in the swimsuit competition wearing a gown, maintaining a long-held Rwanda tradition of not wearing bikinis in public.

Miss Lebanon 2018 Salwa Akar received international press attention when she was stripped of her title in Lebanon, while participating in Miss Earth 2018 pageant after she posted a photo in Facebook with her arm around Miss Israel's Dana Zerik and gestured the peace sign. Lebanon and Israel are in a long standing state of war. As a result, she was unable to continue her participation in the Miss Earth pageant. In a press release, Israel's Prime Minister Benjamin Netanyahu's spokesman Ofir Gendelman, reacted on Akar's dethronement and condemned the "Lebanese apartheid."

Papua New Guinea sent its first representative in the Miss Earth 2019 pageant with Pauline Tibola, becoming the first representative in the Big Four international beauty pageants since Miss World 1990.

In 2020, the 20th edition of Miss Earth marked the entrant of countries such as Bangladesh (Meghna Alam), Burkina Faso (Amira Naïmah Bassané) and Syria (Tiya Alkerdi). It was the second time Burkina Faso participated in the Big Four pageants after Miss International 2019 and first for Syria to participate in major international pageant in several decades after Miss World 1966.

Host countries

The pageant was held in the Philippines every year from 2001 to 2009. Miss Earth 2006 was scheduled to be held in Santiago, Chile on November 15, 2006, but the host country failed to meet the requirements of the host committee; the pageant was moved back to the Philippines.

In 2008, the pageant was held for the first time outside Metropolitan Manila. It was held at the Clark Expo Amphitheater in Angeles City, Pampanga on November 9, 2008.

In 2009, the pageant took place for the first time outside Luzon Island. The coronation night venue for Miss Earth 2009 was held at the Boracay Ecovillage Resort and Convention Center in the Island of Boracay, Philippines.

In 2010, the pageant finally took place for the first time outside the Philippines. The coronation night venue for Miss Earth 2010 was held at the Vinpearl Land Amphitheater at Nha Trang, Vietnam.

In 2011, the pageant was scheduled to be held on December 3, 2011, at the Impact, Muang Thong Thani, Bangkok, Thailand but due to flood situation in Thailand, Carousel Productions decided to move the Miss Earth 2011 pageant venue back to Manila, Philippines.

In 2012, the pageant was supposed to be held in Bali, Indonesia but the organizers did not meet the minimum requirements on time, so it was moved back to the Philippines. Miss Earth 2012 was held on November 24, 2012, at the Palace in Muntinlupa, Philippines.

In 2015, the pageant was held for the first time in Europe at Marx Halle in Vienna, Austria.

On July 18, 2022, vice-president of Miss Earth organization Lorraine Schuck announced that Miss Earth 2023 will be held in Vietnam for the second time.

Venues

Virtual editions
The COVID-19 pandemic caused travel restrictions would have the contestants to travel to the Philippines and would be forced to subject on a 14-day quarantine period upon arrival in that country. It was announced on 14 August 2020, the Miss Earth Organization would have to crown their new titleholders on a virtual coronation night scheduled for 29 November 2020 for the first time in the organization's history, such occurrence a major beauty pageant held virtually from the participants' home countries for the first time since the inception of beauty pageants dated back to the 1920s.

The pageant started on 21 September 2020 and ran for a couple of months. On 12 October 2020, the organization held a "Getting to Know You" virtual meet and greet with each delegate hosted by former Miss Earth 2008 Karla Henry. The pageant preliminary was streamed online on virtual channel KTX on 24 November 2020.

The candidates were split into four continental groups: Asia & Oceania, Africa, Americas, and Europe and then competed in the following categories: Earth Talk, Talent, Evening Gown, Swimsuit, Sports Wear, National Costume, and Interview with Netizens. The preliminary judging categories are: Beauty of Face, Fitness, and Environmental Awareness.

The pre-pageant activities and coronation night were conducted virtually due to the ongoing COVID-19 pandemic for the second consecutive year in 2021.

Eligibility and judging criteria

Competing delegates must have never been married or given birth and be between 18 and 28 years of age. In the pre-judging stage, Miss Earth delegates are judged on their intelligence and their knowledge of environmental issues and policies, comprising 30% of the total score, while the remaining criteria are as follows: 35% for beauty and knowledge, 20% form and figure, 10% poise, and 5% attitude. The delegates then participate in three rounds of competition: swimsuit, evening gown and question-and-answer. The last round focuses on topics of environmental concern.

Titles and semi-finalists

In the early years of the pageant, from 2001 to 2003, ten semi-finalists were chosen at Miss Earth. From 2004 to 2017, sixteen semi-finalists are chosen with the exception of the 2010 (10th) edition where only 14 semi-finalists were selected. The number has since then increased to 18 in 2018 and 20 in 2019. Since 2004, Semi-finalists are cut to eight finalists, then to the final four from which the runners-up and winner are announced. By 2019, the number of finalists were increased to ten.

The pageant's winner is crowned Miss Earth; the Runners-up are named after classical elements: Miss Fire (third runner-up), Miss Water (second runner-up), and Miss Air (first runner-up); from 2010, the "elemental titles" (Air, Water and Fire bestowed on the next three delegates with highest scores after the Miss Earth winner) were proclaimed of equal importance and thus have the same ranking and no longer classified as "runner-up."

Recent titleholders

Gallery of titleholders

Crown and jewelry

The Miss Earth crown used in 2001 and the Swarovski crown in 2002–2008 were designed and created by a multi-awarded Filipino designer named Arnel Papa.

On November 16, 2009, Miss Earth unveiled a new crown designed by jewelry designer Ramona Haar with the frame made of 100% recycled 14K gold and argentums sterling silver and the stones composed of black diamonds, sardonyx, calcite, ruby, jade quartz crystal, garnet, peridot, and pearls gathered from over 80 of the participating countries in 2009. In the 13th edition of the Miss Earth, new tiaras were introduced for the elemental titleholders called elemental crowns which represent air, water and fire with colorful stones in yellow, blue and red.

See also
 Big Four international beauty pageants
 List of beauty contests

References

Further reading
 Feminism, Beauty Pageants and the Environment: 
 An old chestnut recycled: Miss Earth:

External links 

 
International beauty pageants
Recurring events established in 2001